Virginia Highlands Airport  is a public use airport located two nautical miles (4 km) west of the central business district of Abingdon, a city in Washington County, Virginia, United States. It is owned by the Virginia Highlands Airport Authority. This airport is included in the National Plan of Integrated Airport Systems for 2011–2015, which categorized it as a general aviation facility.

Facilities and aircraft 
Virginia Highlands Airport covers an area of 184 acres (74 ha) at an elevation of 2,087 feet (636 m) above mean sea level. It has one runway designated 6/24 with an asphalt surface measuring 4,471 by 75 feet (1,363 x 23 m).

For the 12-month period ending May 31, 2011, the airport had 25,260 aircraft operations, an average of 69 per day: 90% general aviation, 9.% air taxi, and 1% military. At that time there were 67 aircraft based at this airport: 69% single-engine, 10% jet, 8% multi-engine, 8% helicopter, and 6% ultralight.

References

External links 
 Virginia Highlands Airport, official site
 Aerial image as of April 1998 from USGS The National Map
 

Airports in Virginia
Transportation in Washington County, Virginia